Roy Briggs (1 November 1920 – 1995) was an English professional footballer who played in the Football League for Mansfield Town.

References

1920 births
1995 deaths
English footballers
Association football forwards
English Football League players
Mansfield Town F.C. players